Maurice Desaymonnet (24 June 1921 – 4 November 2015) was a French basketball player who competed in the 1948 Summer Olympics. He was part of the French basketball team, which won the silver medal. Desaymonnet died in November 2015 at the age of 94.

References

External links
Maurice Desaymonet's profile at databaseOlympics

1921 births
2015 deaths
French men's basketball players
Olympic basketball players of France
Basketball players at the 1948 Summer Olympics
Olympic silver medalists for France
Olympic medalists in basketball
Medalists at the 1948 Summer Olympics
1950 FIBA World Championship players